"So Far Under" is a song by the American rock band Alice in Chains and the second single from the band's sixth studio album, Rainier Fog, released on August 24, 2018. The single was released via YouTube, streaming and digital download on June 27, 2018. The lyrics and music were written by Alice In Chains' co-lead vocalist and rhythm guitarist William DuVall, who also played the guitar solo in the song.

Origin
"So Far Under" is the first Alice in Chains song written entirely by William DuVall, and the first in the band's catalog written entirely by someone other than Jerry Cantrell or Layne Staley. DuVall said about the song in a press release:

Release and reception
The song was released on Alice in Chains' official YouTube channel on June 27, 2018, and it is also available for streaming and digital download via Spotify, iTunes, Amazon Music, Apple Music, Google Play and Deezer.

Revolver magazine said that the song "finds the band leavening their signature grunge with dreary, hypnotic grooves reminiscent of Electric Wizard". For Loudwire, "the track, heard seems to be a perfect fit for the Alice catalog, with a familiar guitar and drum sound. "So far under / Too much pain to tell / Now I'm ripped asunder / So far under," come the hypnotically-delivered lyrics of the chorus over evil sounding guitars."

The song peaked at No. 3 on Amazon's Best Sellers in Rock, and at No. 23 on Amazon's Top 100 Paid Songs.

Music video
The music video for "So Far Under" was released on Alice In Chains' YouTube channel on June 6, 2019. It was directed by Adam Mason and continues the storyline that started with the music video for Rainier Fog'''s first single, "The One You Know". The video for "So Far Under" is the eighth episode of the sci-fi series Black Antenna'', which tells the story of father and daughter named Alpha and Beta, two aliens disguised as humans who drive across California in silence, speaking only telepathically. Along the way, the daughter seduces men and steals from them to help her father build an antenna so that he can send a message to their people at home. At the same time, they are being tracked down by evil forces and must avoid being killed. Written by Adam Mason and Paul Sloan, the video stars Paul Sloan as Alpha, Viktoriya Dov as Beta, Darri Ingolfsson as Nil and Lily Robinson as Malum.

Live performances
Alice in Chains performed the song live for the first time during their concert at the Queen Elizabeth Theatre in Vancouver, Canada on August 22, 2018.

Personnel
William DuVall – lead vocals, lead guitar
Jerry Cantrell – rhythm guitar, backing vocals
Mike Inez – bass
Sean Kinney – drums

Chart positions

References

External links 

2018 songs
2018 singles
Alice in Chains songs
Songs written by William DuVall
BMG Rights Management singles
Sludge metal songs
Doom metal songs
Song recordings produced by Nick Raskulinecz